French lilac is a common name for several plants and may refer to:

Syringa vulgaris of the family Oleaceae
Galega officinalis, of the family Papilionaceae